Ruslan Dmytrovich Bogdan (born 28 January 1972 in Kyiv) is a Ukrainian businessman, and politician.

Biography

Education
He studied at the secondary school No. 234, Kyiv. In 1989 Ruslan entered Kyiv Suvorov Military School (now Ivan Bohun Military High School), "military training" faculty. 
1992-1997 - he studied at the Ukrainian State University of Physical Education and Sports
1996-2000 - studied at Kyiv National University, majoring in Economics
In 2008 he graduated from the Ivano-Frankivsk National Technical University of Oil and Gas, majoring in Geology

Career
 1994-2001 - LLC "FURT", started as chief of logistics, and then became the Finance Director
 2001-2007 - LLC "Energotorg", First Deputy Director

Politics
In 2005, Bogdan joined the Reforms and Order Party. In the 2006 Ukrainian parliamentary election he was a candidate for the party in its Civil Bloc "PORA-PRP" (with PORA) as number 31 on this  election list. This alliance received 1.47% and no seats at the election.

In the 2007 Ukrainian parliamentary election Bogdan was elected to parliament as number 146 of the election list of the Yulia Tymoshenko Bloc as a member of Reforms and Order Party.

Bogdan was expelled from the Verkhovna Rada fraction Bloc of Yulia Tymoshenko - Fatherland in February 2011. Since then he barely attended parliamentary sessions. In July 2012, he re-joined the Bloc of Yulia Tymoshenko — Fatherland fraction.

 Member of the Verkhovna Rada Committee on Fuel and Energy Complex, Nuclear Policy and Nuclear Safety (since December 2007) 
 Member of the Standing Delegation in the Interparliamentary Assembly of Commonwealth of Independent States 
 Member of the Group for Interparliamentary Relations with the Republic of Lithuania
 Member of the Group for Interparliamentary Relations with the French Republic
 Member of the Group for Interparliamentary Relations with Ireland
 Member of the Group for Interparliamentary Relations with the Austrian Republic
 Member of the Group for Interparliamentary Relations with the United Kingdom of Great Britain and Northern Ireland 
 Member of the Group for Interparliamentary Relations with the Republic of Estonia 
 Member of the Group for Interparliamentary Relations with the State of Kuwait
 Member of the Group for Interparliamentary Relations with the Kingdom of Norway 
 Member of the Group for Interparliamentary Relations with the Slovak Republic 
 Member of the Group for Interparliamentary Relations with Russian Federation
 Member of the Group for Interparliamentary Relations with the Italian Republic
 Member of the Group for Interparliamentary Relations with the Federal Republic of Germany
 Member of the Group for Interparliamentary Relations with the Swiss Confederation
 Member of the Group for Interparliamentary Relations with the Republic of Portugal 
 Member of the Group for Interparliamentary Relations with the Kingdom of Sweden
 Member of the Group for Interparliamentary Relations with the Kingdom of Denmark 
 Member of the Group for Interparliamentary Relations with the Czech Republic
 Member of the Group for Interparliamentary Relations with the Republic of Hungary 
 Member of the Group for Interparliamentary Relations with the Republic of Cuba
 Member of the Group for Interparliamentary Relations with Latvia
 Member of the Group for Interparliamentary Relations with the Kingdom of Belgium
 Member of the Group for Interparliamentary Relations with the Kingdom of Spain
 Member of the Group for Interparliamentary Relations with Poland

Member of the Verkhovna Rada Temporary Inquiry Panel on the audit of the National Bank of Ukraine during the financial crisis (from 18 December 2008 to 18 December 2009) and Member of the Verkhovna Rada Interim Commission on the decision of the Arbitration Institute of Stockholm Chamber of Commerce, investigation the facts of corruption by "RosUkrEnergo" and the involvement of public authorities and arrest of the former head of the State Customs service of Ukraine A. Makarenko(from 1 July 2010 to 19 November 2010)

In 2012 he was not re-elected into parliament on the party list of "Fatherland" (number 73).

During 17 July 2016 constituency mid-term elections Bogdan was elected back into the Ukrainian parliament for Fatherland.

In the 2019 Ukrainian parliamentary election Bogdan failed as a Fatherland candidate in constituency 151 (in Poltava Oblast) to get reelected to parliament. He lost this election with 15.58% of the votes to Maksym Berezin of the party Servant of the People (who won with 47.45% of the votes).

See also
2007 Ukrainian parliamentary election
List of Ukrainian Parliament Members 2007

References

Living people
1972 births
Sixth convocation members of the Verkhovna Rada
Eighth convocation members of the Verkhovna Rada
All-Ukrainian Union "Fatherland" politicians
Reforms and Order Party politicians
Businesspeople from Kyiv
Politicians from Kyiv
Taras Shevchenko National University of Kyiv alumni